The 2020 E. P. T. 200 was the 10th stock car race of the 2020 NASCAR Gander RV & Outdoors Truck Series season. The race was meant to be a temporary replacement for the formerly scheduled Camping World 225 that was scheduled to take place at Chicagoland Speedway due to the COVID-19 pandemic. The race was held on Saturday, July 25, 2020, in Kansas City, Kansas at Kansas Speedway, a  permanent D-shaped oval racetrack. The race took the scheduled 134 laps to complete. At race's end, Matt Crafton would win the race after taking the lead on the final restart to win the 15th NASCAR Gander RV & Outdoors Truck Series win of his career, and the first and only win of the season for Crafton.

Background 

Kansas Speedway is a 1.5-mile (2.4 km) tri-oval race track in Kansas City, Kansas. It was built in 2001 and hosts two annual NASCAR race weekends. The NTT IndyCar Series also raced there until 2011. The speedway is owned and operated by the International Speedway Corporation.

Entry list 

*Withdrew.

**Originally, Viens was slated to drive the #49, but the driver would change to Ray Ciccarelli for unknown reasons. As a result, the #83 would withdraw.

Starting lineup 
The starting lineup was set by partial inversion of the previous race, the 2020 Blue-Emu Maximum Pain Relief 200. Only the top 15 was inverted. As a result, Chase Purdy of GMS Racing won the pole.

Race results 
Stage 1 Laps: 30

Stage 2 Laps: 30

Stage 3 Laps: 74

References 

2020 NASCAR Gander RV & Outdoors Truck Series
NASCAR races at Kansas Speedway
July 2020 sports events in the United States
2020 in sports in Kansas